Erich John Waschneck (29 April 1887, in Grimma, Kingdom of Saxony – 22 September 1970, in Berlin) was a German cameraman, director, screenwriter, and film producer.

Early life

Erich was the son of Karl Hermann  Waschneck, a blacksmith, and his wife Therese Emilie, née Schneider. Waschneck went to finishing school at the Leipzig Art Academy and studied painting.

Career

He came in contact with the film industry in 1907 when he began to paint posters for films. He then worked as a still photographer and later as a camera assistant to cinematographer Fritz Arno Wagner .

In 1921, he did his first work as a cameraman in the adaptation of the fairy tale The Little Muck by Wilhelm Hauff. From 1924 he worked as a director. His film Eight Girls in a boat (1932) won the Gold Medal at the Venice Film Festival. In 1932 he became managing director of  Beacon-Film GmbH in Berlin and film producer. After the Nazi rise to power, into force on 4th Waschneck April 1933 the National Socialist Factory Cell Organization German-born film directors with. [1] In 1940, he directed the anti-Semitic propaganda film The Rothschilds'''.

After the war Waschneck was only able to direct two films.

Personal life

In 1933 Waschneck married the actress Karin Hardt. Waschneck is buried in the old cemetery in Wannsee.

Selected filmography

 The Pearl of the Orient (1921)
 Love at the Wheel (1921)
 Barmaid (1922)
 The Girl with the Mask (1922)
 A Glass of Water (1923)
 The Chain Clinks (1923)
 The New Land (1924)
 The Stolen Professor (1924)
 Struggle for the Soil (1925)
 My Friend the Chauffeur (1926)
 The Man in the Fire  (1926)
 Regine (1927)
 The Woman with the World Record (1927)
 Aftermath (1927)
 Sajenko the Soviet (1928)
 Docks of Hamburg (1928)
 Scandal in Baden-Baden (1929)
 Favorite of Schonbrunn (1929)
 Diane (1929)
 The Love of the Brothers Rott (1929)
 Two People (1930)
 Sacred Waters (1932)
 Eight Girls in a Boat (1932)
 Impossible Love (1932)
 Hände aus dem Dunkel (1933)
 Adventure on the Southern Express (1934)
 Music in the Blood (1934)
 Regine (1935)
 My Life for Maria Isabella (1935)
 Liebesleute – Hermann und Dorothea von Heute (1935), awarded: "artistically valuable"
 Uncle Bräsig (1936)
 Escapade (1936)
 Gewitterflug zu Claudia (1937)
 The Divine Jetta (1937)
 Anna Favetti (1938)
 Women for Golden Hill (1938)
 Kennwort Machin (1939)
 The Rothschilds (1940)
 Between Hamburg and Haiti (1940)
 The Roedern Affair (1944)
 Thank You, I'm Fine (1948)
 Three Days of Fear (1952)
 Have Sunshine in Your Heart'' (1953)

External links

1887 births
1970 deaths
People from Grimma
People from the Kingdom of Saxony
Film people from Saxony
Nazi propagandists
Propaganda film directors